The Prime Minister of Spain is the head of the Government of Spain. Under Article 99 of the Constitution of Spain, the Prime Minister is appointed by the King of Spain on the nomination of the Congress of Deputies, the lower house of the Cortes Generales. The candidate to the position of Prime Minister is not required to be a member of Congress.

After a general election or the resignation of a Prime Minister, members of the Congress are proposed by the King to the position of Prime Minister. There can be only one candidate per session. If the Congress of Deputies, by the vote of the absolute majority of its members, gives its confidence to said candidate, the King will appoint them as Prime Minister. If said majority is not reached, the same proposal will be submitted to a new vote forty-eight hours after the previous one, and trust will be deemed granted if a simple majority is obtained.

The Constitution of Spain came into operation on 6 December 1978, following the dictatorship of Francisco Franco, following Spanish transition to democracy.

A breakdown of votes is on the pages of governments formed, while support for unsuccessful candidates is noted below.

References 

Politics of Spain
Government of Spain
Political history of Spain